Joey Blake (born July 14, 1967) is an American former professional tennis player.

Blake, born in Michigan, was the 1985 US Open junior doubles champion (with Darren Yates) and finished runner-up to Tim Trigueiro in the singles event. He was ranked as high as four in the world for juniors by the ITF.

Attending the University of Arkansas, Blake made an immediate impact in collegiate tennis, winning the 1986 National Indoor Intercollegiate Tennis Championship. He turned professional following his sophomore season.

Blake competed in professional tournaments during the late 1980s with limited success. He had a win over former world number 12 Steve Denton at the 1986 Livingston Open and beat Glenn Michibata at the 1986 Canadian Open.

References

External links
 
 

1967 births
Living people
American male tennis players
Tennis people from Michigan
People from Coldwater, Michigan
Arkansas Razorbacks men's tennis players
US Open (tennis) junior champions
Grand Slam (tennis) champions in boys' doubles
20th-century American people